Patrick Joseph Cowley (October 19, 1950 – November 12, 1982) was an American disco and hi-NRG dance music composer and recording artist. Along with Giorgio Moroder, he often is credited as a pioneer of electronic dance music.

Early life
Patrick Cowley was born October 19, 1950 in Buffalo, New York to Ellen and Kenneth Cowley. The family originated in the Horseheads and Corning areas of New York and lived in Rochester. During his teenage years, Cowley became a successful drummer with local amateur bands before attending Niagara University and later the University at Buffalo to study English. In 1971, at the age of 21, Cowley moved to San Francisco to attend the City College of San Francisco (CCSF) where he studied music, specifically the use of synthesizers, from Gerald Mueller.

Musical career
Cowley met San Francisco-based musician Sylvester in 1978. Sylvester had asked Cowley to join his studio band after hearing some of his early synthesizer recordings. He played synthesizer on Sylvester's 1978 album Step II which included the hits "You Make Me Feel (Mighty Real)" and "Dance (Disco Heat)". In addition, he wrote "Stars" and "I Need Somebody to Love Tonight" from his 1979 album Stars. Cowley also joined Sylvester's live band and joined him on several world tours.

Cowley's own hits included "Menergy" in 1981, a frank celebration of the gay club scene, and "Megatron Man", which hit #1 and #2 respectively on the Billboard Hot Dance Music/Club Play chart in 1981. That same year, Patrick Cowley was celebrated at the Menergy parties at The EndUp in San Francisco. Cowley recorded an album at The Stud in San Francisco. He also wrote and produced the dance single "Right on Target" for San Francisco artist Paul Parker, which reached #1 on the Billboard dance chart in 1982. "Do Ya Wanna Funk", a collaboration with Sylvester, made #4 on the Billboard dance chart that same year. Cowley also did a 15'45" long remix of Donna Summer's "I Feel Love", which is now a collector's item. Mind Warp, his final album, was composed as he felt the increasing effects of HIV infection, and its songs reflect his increasing detachment from conventional reality as the disease progressed.

Death
During a world tour with Sylvester in late 1981, Cowley complained of feeling increasingly unwell. Upon returning to the United States, he visited a doctor who diagnosed food poisoning. Weeks later, with his condition only worsening, doctors again failed to identify what was wrong with him. At this early stage in the history of HIV/AIDS virus – at the time still referred to as "gay-related immune deficiency" (GRID) by American doctors – misdiagnosis was common and so Cowley, who was gay, was discharged from the hospital (in 1982) after doctors could do nothing more for him. Cowley died at his home in the Castro District neighborhood in San Francisco on November 12, 1982. He was 32 years old, an early victim of AIDS.

Legacy
Despite never fully achieving mainstream commercial success, Cowley is nevertheless regarded as a pioneer of early electronic music and the creator of hi-NRG, an uptempo strain of disco. Various 1980s artists such as Pet Shop Boys and New Order have cited his influence as a producer. Cowley has been described as "a musical pioneer whose achievements rippled throughout queer culture and beyond into the disco mainstream".

Since the 2010s, Cowley's profile has risen as "listeners and scholars excavate disco's intersection with gay liberation."

Amid the accompanying emergence of nu-disco in the late 2000s and early 2010s, profiles of Cowley in Gawker and other high-profile outlets have contributed to a resurgence of interest in his work. 2009 saw the release of Catholic, a compilation of post-punk-flavored collaborations with writer/singer Jorge Socarras from 1976 to 1979.

Discography

Albums

Notable collaborations
Cowley wrote and produced songs for several San Francisco musicians including friends Paul Parker and Frank Loverde. He was associated with many other musicians such as Kat Mandu, Maurice Tani and Linda Imperial.

 "Right on Target" by Paul Parker (1982)
 "Die Hard Lover" by Frank Loverde (1982)
 "Do You Wanna Funk" by Sylvester (1982)
 "Tech-no-logical world" by Paul Parker (1982)

See also

 List of artists who reached number one on the US Dance chart

References

External links
 Daniel Heinzmann — Patrick Cowley: biography 1 2 3 4 5
 Myspace page
 Myspace page for Catholic album
 Bandcamp page for Patrick Cowley
 soundcloud page for Patrick Cowley

1950 births
1982 deaths
American dance musicians
American disco musicians
American electronic musicians
American hi-NRG musicians
Musicians from Buffalo, New York
Musicians from Rochester, New York
American gay musicians
LGBT people from New York (state)
AIDS-related deaths in California
20th-century American musicians
City College of San Francisco alumni
20th-century American LGBT people